Axel Daniel Gómez Guzmán (born 28 June 2000) is a Honduran professional footballer currently playing as a left-back.

Career statistics

Club

Notes

References

Living people
2000 births
Honduran footballers
Honduras youth international footballers
Association football defenders
Liga Nacional de Fútbol Profesional de Honduras players
C.D. Olimpia players
Honduras under-20 international footballers